A horse coat color that has the sooty trait is characterized by black or darker hairs mixed into a horse's coat, typically concentrated along the topline of the horse and less prevalent on the underparts. Sootiness is presumed to be an inherited trait, though the precise genetic mechanism, or series of mechanisms, is not well understood.

In most cases, sooty coats exhibit pronounced countershading; the dorsal region is darker than the ventral region. However, some forms seem to produce darker lower parts. The "false dorsal" or "countershading dorsal" can mimic the dorsal stripe associated with dun horses and is associated with the sooty trait. The most extensive expression of sooty produces a dark, often-dappled cast oriented down from the topline. Many horses with the sooty trait have a darker mask on the bony parts of the face.

It was once thought that the sooty trait was responsible for turning chestnut into liver chestnut; however, it is not known to uniformly darken the coat. The sooty trait is responsible for many dark bays and has a particularly pronounced effect on buckskins and palominos.

Although this trait has been called the "sooty gene", similar coat-darkening conditions studied in mice suggest that coat darkening is a polygenic trait. Just as in horses, the degree of sootiness in mice varies widely; some individuals have darker hairs that form a dorsal line, while others have extensive sootiness throughout. A statistical analysis of 1,369 offspring of five Franches-Montagnes stallions indicated that darker shades of chestnut and bay might follow a recessive mode of inheritance.

Horses without any visible sooty coloration are termed "clear-coated."

See also

Seal brown (horse)

References

Horse coat colors